The Shadow of the Mosque (German:Im Schatten der Moschee) is a 1923 German silent film directed by Walter R. Hall and starring Stewart Rome.

The film's art direction was by Franz Schroedter and Curt Wiese

Cast
In alphabetical order
 Lys Andersen 
 Dora Bergner 
 Esther Carena 
 Edmund Löwe
 Stewart Rome 
 Aruth Wartan

References

Bibliography
 Grange, William. Cultural Chronicle of the Weimar Republic. Scarecrow Press, 2008.

External links

1923 films
Films of the Weimar Republic
German silent feature films
Films set in the Middle East
German black-and-white films